Saturno is the third studio album by Puerto Rican singer Rauw Alejandro. It was released on November 11, 2022, through Sony Music Latin and Duars Entertainment. The album features collaborations with Baby Rasta, DJ Playero, Chris Palace, Arcángel, Súbelo NEO, Lyanno and Brray.

Singles 
The first single of the album was "Lokera", a collaboration with Lyanno and Brray released on July 25, 2022. The second single was "Punto 40" with Baby Rasta, released on September 22, 2022.

Following the success of "Punto 40", Alejandro released "Dime Quién????" on October 28, 2022. On November 10, 2022, he released the video of "Lejos del Cielo".

The album's final single, "Panties y Brasieres" was released on January 26, 2023.

Critical reception 

Julyssa Lopez of Rolling Stone says Rauw Alejandro finds his own place in the pop cosmos on Saturno.

Commercial performance 
Saturno debuted at number 25 on the US Billboard 200, including number 2 on both the Top Latin Albums and Latin Rhythm Albums charts with 19,000 album-equivalent units.

Track listing

Charts

Weekly charts

Year-end charts

Certifications

References 

2022 albums
Rauw Alejandro albums
Spanish-language albums
Sony Music Latin albums
Albums produced by Tainy